Donald Richard Page (born 18 January 1964) is an English former footballer who played as a forward.

He started his career in non-league football with Altrincham, Northwich Victoria and Runcorn. In March 1989, he signed for Wigan Athletic, and went on play for several Football League clubs, his last being Scarborough. After his release in the summer of 1996,  he then dropped back into non-league,  featuring for Matlock Town, Telford United, Northwich Victoria and Blyth Spartans . He later worked in the Finance Department at Warwickshire County Council.

References

External links

1964 births
Living people
Footballers from Manchester
English footballers
Association football forwards
Altrincham F.C. players
Northwich Victoria F.C. players
Runcorn F.C. Halton players
Wigan Athletic F.C. players
English Football League players
Rotherham United F.C. players
Rochdale A.F.C. players
Doncaster Rovers F.C. players
Chester City F.C. players
Scarborough F.C. players
Matlock Town F.C. players
AFC Telford United players
Blyth Spartans A.F.C. players